John of Ibelin (Jean d'Ibelin, died after 1250) was a member of the House of Ibelin and a crusader to the Kingdom of Cyprus.

He was the son of Baldwin of Ibelin, seneschal of Cyprus, and of Alice de Bethsan, daughter of Walter III of Bethsan and Theodora Comnena Lathoumena.

He married Isabelle du Rivet, daughter of Aimery du Rivet and Echive de Saint-Omer.  They had:
Baldwin of Ibelin (died 1313)

Ancestry

References

House of Ibelin
Christians of the Crusades